The Biggest Winner is an Arabic reality television show that began broadcasting on MBC 1 in 2006. Filming took place in Lebanon. The show is an adaptation of the American reality television show The Biggest Loser.  The show features a host, personal trainers, and a dietitian who help the contestants lose weight. As of December 2009, MBC 1 has presented four seasons of the show with a total of 58 contestants from 14  Arabic countries.

It is not known if there will be a fifth season. Reruns of the first four seasons were aired in MBC Masr.

Premise
The basic premise of the show is that overweight contestants compete to win cash (and other prizes) by losing the highest percentage of their starting body weight.

Seasons
Season 1

This season premiered on April 29, 2006, with 14 contestants from nine Arabic countries. The contestants were divided into two teams: Blue Team and Red Team. The winner of season 1 was Jordanian Abdlallah Hamad, who was awarded 250,000 SAR and a Ford Explorer. On the reunion show, Iraqi Walid Al-Jasem won 50,000 SAR.

Season 2

This season premiered on October 27, 2007, with 14 contestants from 10 Arabic countries. The contestants were divided into two teams: Blue Team and Red Team.  Unlike season one, in this season all members of Blue Team were men and Red Team were women. The winner of season 2 was Walid Humaid from U.A.E., who was awarded 250,000 SAR. On the reunion show, Saudi Arabian Salimah Al-Hebshi won 50,000 SAR.

Season 3

This season premiered on October 11, 2008, with 14 contestants from 10 Arabic countries. The contestants were divided into two teams: Blue Team and Red Team. The winner of season 3 was Mohammad Mazboudi from Lebanon, who was awarded 250,000 SAR. On the reunion show, Hasan Al-Rawi from Iraq won 50,000 SAR.

Season 4

This season premiered on September 26, 2009 and, unlike all past seasons, eight couples from six Arabic countries competed during 11 weeks. There is a relationship between each couple except the Yellow Team, who are strangers. The other teams are either siblings, spouses, or friends. The winner of season 4 was Karim Abdullah from Egypt who was awarded 250,000 SAR. On the reunion show, Orwa Al-Korah from Syria won 50,000 SAR, and for first time in the programs history the 3rd place Abdulaziz Shesha won 20,000 SAR and the 2nd place Marah Al-Korah won 30,000 SAR.

See also
Obesity in Kuwait
Obesity in Saudi Arabia
Obesity in the United Arab Emirates

References

External links
 Official Arabian version الرابح الاكبر  website

The Biggest Loser
Fitness reality television series
2006 Lebanese television series debuts
2009 Lebanese television series endings
Lebanese television series
Non-American television series based on American television series